The Public Land Law Review Commission (PLLRC) was established on  in order to review federal public land laws and regulations of the United States and to recommend a public land policy. The Commission met between 1965 and 1969.

References 
 Inventory of the Public Land Law Review Commission Records, 1966 - 1970 in the Forest History Society Library and Archives, Durham, North Carolina
 Records of the Public Land Law Review Commission in the National Archives

External links
 Inventory of the Public Land Law Review Commission Records, 1966 - 1970 in the Forest History Society Library and Archives, Durham, NC
 Records of the Public Land Law Review Commission in the National Archives
 The Public Land Law Review Commission (PLLRC), 1964-1970 in the Morris K. Udall Papers at the University of Arizona

United States public land law